Pearl Island may refer to:
 Mikimoto Pearl Island in Japan
 Pearl Island (Hong Kong)
 Pearl Island (Washington)
 The Pearl-Qatar
 Pearl Island, a small island of New Zealand
 An alternative name of Perl Island, Alaska

See also
Pearl Islands